Jonathan Powers, commonly called Jon Powers is an American former soldier, charity organizer, government official and business executive.  He was appointed by President Obama to serve in multiple roles as an energy security expert.

In 2015, Powers founded a financial company, CleanCapital that invests in clean energy. In this role, Powers was named to Washington Life’s Top 25 Tech Leader for DC, 2016 and to Renewable Energy World's 40 under 40 in 2018.

War Kids Relief 
Powers returned from military service in Iraq with plans of becoming a social studies teacher in Clarence Public School District. However, he decided to Baghdad and founded the non-profit organization War Kids Relief.

The aim of War Kids relief was to engage Iraq's youth and minimize recruitment by radicalized elements. The youth and counterterrorism research and program development efforts led to War Kids Relief becoming a leading advocacy organization working to create a bridge between American and Iraqi youth to build a foundation for peace.

War Kids Relief programs include developing a Youth Center Work/Study Program that takes advantage of existing infrastructure and serves Iraqi youth between the ages of 16 and 25. War Kids Relief works with Iraqi stakeholders such as the Ministry of Youth and Sport, the Ministry of Education, local civic leaders, religious organizations, and the police to develop programs built on indigenous experience and expertise.

War Kids Relief has been featured in a number of national news stories, including NBC Nightly News with Brian Williams series, "Making a Difference", and the Newsweek for the cover story, "The Next Jihadists: Iraq's Lost Children".

However, the Buffalo News criticized Powers's role in War Kids Relief, noting that the organization raised only $41,738 in 2007, but paid Powers $3,000 a month.

Political candidacy 
In 2007, Powers decided to run for Congress in New York's 26th congressional district. Powers received the endorsement of the Democratic Party and the Working Families Party.

In a three-way primary campaign for the Democratic nomination, Powers and rival Jack Davis, who had been the Democratic nominee in 2004 and 2006, released a series of negative ads targeting one another. The third candidate, Alice Kryzan claimed the Democratic nomination on September 9, 2008. Powers remained the nominee of the Working Families Party despite his efforts to have his name removed from the ballot and his endorsement of Kryzan. Kryzan was defeated by businessman Chris Lee in the general election.

Government service 
Powers served as the Special Advisor on Energy in the Office of the Assistant Secretary of the Army, Installations, Energy & Environment. He also served as the Chief Operating Officer at the Truman National Security Project, where he focused on energy security issues. In 2009, Powers testified to the US Senate Committee on Environment and Public Works on the national security implications of climate change with retired Senator John Warner and Vice Admiral Dennis McGinn. Following this testimony, Powers founded the nationally recognized campaign Operation Free for veterans to advocate for a national energy policy.

Powers was appointed by President Obama to serve as the Administration's Federal Environmental Executive. In this capacity, Powers was responsible for promoting environmental and energy sustainability across federal government operations. He oversaw a pipeline of $4 billion in energy performance contracts and nearly tripled the federal government's renewable energy goals.  In this role he was featured in USA Today as Obama's Point Man on Greening the Federal Government.

Business career 
In 2014, Powers joined Bloom Energy as the Managing Director of Public Sector Business Development. In this role, Powers was responsible for business and market development within the public and private sector. In 2015, Powers founded CleanCapital.

References

External links 
War Kids Relief
Jon Powers on Huffington Post
Veterans for America biography
Jon Powers appearance on NBC Nightly News with Brian Williams "Making a Difference" series
Jon Powers interviewed by Newsweek for the cover story, "The Next Jihadists: Iraq's Lost Children"
Transcript of Jon Powers appearance Anderson Cooper 360°, January 10, 2007
IMDB page for the documentary film Gunner Palace
Jon Powers Profile on 26thdistrict

CleanCapital,

Living people
New York (state) Democrats
United States Army officers
United States Army personnel of the Iraq War
John Carroll University alumni
People from Clarence, New York
American chief operating officers
Educators from New York (state)
Year of birth missing (living people)